was a professional wrestling event promoted by World Wonder Ring Stardom. It took place on July 26, 2020 in Tokyo, Japan, at the Korakuen Hall with a limited attendance due in part to the ongoing COVID-19 pandemic at the time. The show aired on August 4, 2020 on tape delay.

Storylines
The show featured seven professional wrestling matches that resulted from scripted storylines, where wrestlers portrayed villains, heroes, or less distinguishable characters in the scripted events that built tension and culminated in a wrestling match or series of matches.

Event
Before the first match taking place, Stardom announced that roster member Itsuki Hoshino would retire due to bad health condition. Hanan and Ruaka's returns were also announced after the two spent much time recovering. The first match saw Saki Kashima picking a victory over Hina. The second match saw Natsuko Tora and Sumire Natsu picking a victory over Death Yama-san and Rina. Next, the Queen's Quest leader Momo Watanabe won her singles bout against the Future of Stardom Champion Maika. The fourth match saw Himeka and Syuri defeating the World of Stardom Champion Mayu Iwatani and Saya Iida. Syuri landed a challenge for the world title to Iwatani which the latter accepted. Next, the Queen's Quest's sub-team of Aphrodite, composed by Utami Hayashishita and Saya Kamitani succeeded in winning the vacant Goddess of Stardom Championship after defeating Jungle Kyona and Konami.

In the main event, Giulia cashed in her 2020 Cinderella Tournament wish, which was to compete for the Wonder of Stardom Championship. But since the title was vacated by Arisa Hoshiki earlier on May 20 due to her retirement, a new opponent for Giulia was chosen, and that would be Tam Nakano. At the end of the night, the Donna Del Mondo leader succeeded in winning the title.

Results

References

External links
Page Stardom World

2020 in professional wrestling
Women's professional wrestling shows
World Wonder Ring Stardom shows
World Wonder Ring Stardom
Professional wrestling in Tokyo